"Black and White" is a song written in 1954 by David I. Arkin and Earl Robinson. It was first recorded by Pete Seeger featuring an African-American child, in 1956 from the album Love Songs for Friends & Foes.

The most successful recording of the song was the pop version by Three Dog Night in 1972, when it reached number one on both the Billboard Hot 100 and Billboard Easy Listening charts. Billboard ranked it as the number 63 song for 1972.  Danny Hutton sang the lead vocals with a children's chorus adding their voices to the song.

Early recordings
Following Seeger's version, the song's writer Earl Robinson released his own recording in 1957, on the Folkways album A Walk in the Sun and other Songs and Ballads. (The album title refers to a song written for the 1945 film A Walk in the Sun.) Sammy Davis Jr. released his version also in 1957.

Reggae groups the Maytones, from Jamaica, and Greyhound, from the UK, both recorded the song in 1971, the latter achieving a top ten hit on the UK Singles Chart at No. 6.

Having heard the Greyhound version, Three Dog Night covered the song and included it on their 1972 album Seven Separate Fools. Their version, which featured a group of children, peaked at number one on the U.S. Pop chart on September 16, 1972, and topped the Easy Listening chart on October 7. Billboard ranked it as the number 63 song for 1972.  The album version featured a freely spoken recitation by Danny Hutton in the coda section of the song.

Other versions
Inner Circle recorded a cover for their 1989 album Identified.

Meaning
The song was inspired by the United States Supreme Court decision of Brown v. Board of Education (1954), which outlawed racial segregation of public schools.

The original lyrics of the song opened with this verse, in reference to the court:

Their robes were black, their heads were white,
The schoolhouse doors were closed so tight,
Nine judges all set down their names,
To end the years and years of shame.

However, the versions of the song recorded by Greyhound and subsequently by Three Dog Night did not include this verse, making the song more universal and less historically specific.

Chart history

Weekly charts

Year-end charts

Certifications

See also
List of Hot 100 number-one singles of 1972 (U.S.)
List of number-one adult contemporary singles of 1972 (U.S.)

References

External links
 

1954 songs
1971 singles
1972 singles
Songs written by Earl Robinson
Three Dog Night songs
Sammy Davis Jr. songs
Billboard Hot 100 number-one singles
Cashbox number-one singles
RPM Top Singles number-one singles
Number-one singles in New Zealand
Dunhill Records singles
American folk songs
Songs against racism and xenophobia
Trojan Records singles
Songs written by David I. Arkin